Paraite is a rural community in the New Plymouth District and Taranaki region of New Zealand's North Island. The area is east of New Plymouth and south of Bell Block. The Marton–New Plymouth line separates Paraite from the industrial area of Bell Block.

Around 1860, during the First Taranaki War, a Māori chief named Aporo or Aparo confronted Charles Everett, a farmer at Paraite. Instead of shooting him, he removed Everett's tie and told him to leave. This was an unusual act of mercy for the time.

The area was divided into allotments for sale in 1867.

Demographics

Paraite had a population of 765 at the 2018 New Zealand census, an increase of 66 people (9.4%) since the 2013 census, and an increase of 204 people (36.4%) since the 2006 census. There were 276 households, comprising 390 males and 375 females, giving a sex ratio of 1.04 males per female. The median age was 45.3 years (compared with 37.4 years nationally), with 135 people (17.6%) aged under 15 years, 126 (16.5%) aged 15 to 29, 378 (49.4%) aged 30 to 64, and 126 (16.5%) aged 65 or older.

Ethnicities were 92.2% European/Pākehā, 14.1% Māori, 2.0% Pacific peoples, 1.6% Asian, and 1.6% other ethnicities. People may identify with more than one ethnicity.

The percentage of people born overseas was 8.6, compared with 27.1% nationally.

Although some people chose not to answer the census's question about religious affiliation, 56.9% had no religion, 33.7% were Christian, 0.4% were Muslim, 0.4% were Buddhist and 1.2% had other religions.

Of those at least 15 years old, 87 (13.8%) people had a bachelor's or higher degree, and 135 (21.4%) people had no formal qualifications. The median income was $37,700, compared with $31,800 nationally. 132 people (21.0%) earned over $70,000 compared to 17.2% nationally. The employment status of those at least 15 was that 345 (54.8%) people were employed full-time, 114 (18.1%) were part-time, and 18 (2.9%) were unemployed.

References

New Plymouth District
Populated places in Taranaki